Carlos Kluwe (January 3, 1890 - September 16, 1966) was a Brazilian footballer and physician who played for Sport Club Internacional.

Kluwe was born and died in Bagé, and was mayor of the town between 1948 and 1951.

Career
 Sport Club Internacional: 1909 - 1919

References

External links
 http://www.internacional.com.br/conteudo?modulo=1&setor=&secao=270&codigo=59

Brazilian footballers
People from Bagé
Sport Club Internacional players
Association football midfielders
Sport Club Internacional managers
1890 births
20th-century Brazilian physicians
Mayors of places in Brazil
Brazilian people of German descent
1966 deaths
Brazilian football managers
Sportspeople from Rio Grande do Sul